The Table Tennis at the 1973 Southeast Asian Peninsular Games was held between 2 and 6 September at National Junior College, Singapore.

Medal summary

Medal table

References
 Yesterday's results
 Yesterday's results
 Yesterday's results
 Yesterday's Seap results

1973 in table tennis
Table tennis competitions in Singapore